The Korean League Cup was a professional football competition in South Korean football. It was held by the K League Federation from 1986 to 2012.

Sponsorship

Champions

List of finals

Titles by club 
K League's principle of official statistics is that final club succeeds to predecessor club's history and records.

Titles by city/province 
K League introduced home and away system in 1987.

Titles by region 
K League introduced home and away system in 1987.

Awards

Best Player

Top goalscorer

Top assist provider

See also
 Adidas Cup
 Korean League Cup (Supplementary Cup)
 Samsung Hauzen Cup
 K League
 Korean FA Cup
 Korean Super Cup
 List of Korean FA Cup winners

References

External links 
Official website  
RSSSF

 
League Cup
National association football league cups
Recurring sporting events established in 1992
Recurring sporting events disestablished in 2012
1992 establishments in South Korea
2012 disestablishments in South Korea